Max J. Kidd (July 27, 1901 – September 1, 1975) was an American high school and college football coach.  He served as the head football coach at Rose Polytechnic Institute—now known as Rose-Hulman Institute of Technology—from 1959 to 1961, compiling a record of 3–17–2.

References

1901 births
1975 deaths
Indiana Hoosiers football players
Rose–Hulman Fightin' Engineers football coaches
High school football coaches in Indiana
People from Bloomfield, Indiana
Players of American football from Indiana